Armond White (born ) is an American film and music critic who writes for National Review and Out. He was previously the editor of CityArts (2011–2014), the lead film critic for the alternative weekly New York Press (1997–2011), and the arts editor and critic for The City Sun (1984–1996). Other publications that have carried his work include Film Comment, Variety, The Nation, The New York Times, Slate, Columbia Journalism Review, and First Things.

White is known for his provocative, idiosyncratic and often contrarian reviews, which have made him a controversial figure in film criticism. As an African-American, gay, and conservative film critic, he has been referred to as a "minority three times over in his profession."

Early life
White was born in Detroit, the youngest of seven children. His family was the first African-American family to move to a primarily Jewish neighborhood on the city's northwest side, where he grew up. Raised Baptist, he later became Pentecostal, and identifies himself as "a believer."

His interest in journalism and film criticism began as a student at Detroit's Central High School, when he first read the book Kiss Kiss Bang Bang by film critic Pauline Kael, whom he cites for "her willingness to go against the hype," along with Andrew Sarris, for his "sophisticated love of cinema," as being a major inspiration on his choice of professional career. White received a Bachelor of Arts in journalism at Wayne State University, followed by a Master of Fine Arts degree in film from Columbia University's School of the Arts in 1997.

Career
White was the arts editor for The City Sun, where he wrote film, music and theater criticism, for the span of its publication from 1984 to 1996. He was hired by New York Press in 1997 and wrote for the paper until it ceased publication in August 2011. He then assumed the editorship of its sister publication CityArts starting in September.

White is a member of the National Society of Film Critics and New York Film Critics Online. He was the three-time chairman of the New York Film Critics Circle (1994, 2009 and 2010), and has also served as a member of the jury at the Sundance Film Festival, Tribeca Film Festival and Mill Valley Film Festival and was a member of several National Endowment for the Arts panels. He has taught classes on film at Columbia University and Long Island University.

In 1992, White was one of nine newspaper and magazine writers to win the ASCAP Deems Taylor Award for music criticism.

In January 2014, White was expelled from the New York Film Critics Circle for allegedly heckling director Steve McQueen at an event for the film 12 Years a Slave. White maintained his innocence, and characterized his expulsion as a "smear campaign." The previous year, White had shouted protests at Michael Moore, while Moore was delivering a speech, as White felt Moore had been unfairly maligning the Catholic Church. Following his 2014 explusion, film critics Harlan Jacobson and Thelma Adams defended White, with the latter describing the move as "Stalinist". White received an Anti-Censorship Award at the 35th annual American Book Awards for being "unfairly removed" from the critics' organization.

Views on film
In 2013, Time Magazine wrote that White's reviews on Rotten Tomatoes agreed with the Tomatometer consensus just under 50% of the time.

White has cited Intolerance as the greatest film ever made, and has referred to A.I. Artificial Intelligence as the best film of the 21st century. White has listed directors Steven Spielberg, Alain Resnais, Zack Snyder, Clint Eastwood, and S. Craig Zahler among his favorites.

A conservative, White often criticizes films with perceived left-wing messages, such as There Will Be Blood, Parasite, Don't Look Up, and Three Thousand Years of Longing. However, he has given high praise to the leftist director Jean-Luc Godard, writing that Godard's films "saw past political fashion". White is also critical of films which promote consumerism, arguing the Toy Story 3 does so, while citing Small Soldiers as the superior film featuring toys. Likewise, White has offered praise to conservative films, describing Mom and Dad, Richard Jewell, Once Upon a Time in Hollywood, France, and Cry Macho as examples. White has stated that when reviewing, he analyzes a film's political viewpoint, because "Ideology is everywhere...[films are] made by people with feelings and ideas and agendas...To me there’s no such thing as just entertainment."

White has provided extensive commentary on gay cinema, offering positive reviews to I Now Pronounce You Chuck & Larry, God's Own Country, and Summer of 85, while giving negative reviews to Brokeback Mountain and Bros.

White also frequently analyzes and discusses the role of race in cinema, having given negative reviews to Black films such as Precious, 12 Years a Slave, Get Out, Nope, Black Panther: Wakanda Forever, and Devotion. Comparatively, he has praised films such as Night of the Living Dead and Hi, Mom! for their depictions of racism, White has cited Cyborg in Zack Snyder's Justice League as a positive example of a black superhero, and Miles Morales in Spider-Man: Into the Spider-Verse as a poor one.

White is generally critical of superhero movies, giving negative reviews to The Dark Knight, Wonder Woman, Avengers: Endgame, and The Batman, while describing Marvel Cinematic Universe films as "formulaic". However, he has offered praise to Ghost Rider: Spirit of Vengeance, Watchmen, Man of Steel, Batman v Superman: Dawn of Justice, and Zack Snyder's Justice League; writing that Zack Snyder "rescued comic-book movies from nihilism and juvenilia, making modern myths worthy of adult spirituality and politics".

White has attacked contemporary film criticism, awards shows, and film journalism. White derided the Sight and Sound Greatest Films of All Time 2022 poll for selecting Jeanne Dielman, 23 quai du Commerce, 1080 Bruxelles as the greatest film of all time, describing it as "a dull Marxist-feminist token", chosen for political reasons. He provided his own selections for the poll, which included À bout de souffle, Battleship Potemkin, Intolerance,  Jules et Jim, L’Avventura, Lawrence of Arabia, Lola, The Magnificent Ambersons, Nashville, and The Passion of Joan of Arc.

Favorite films
In the 2012 Sight and Sound poll, Armond White listed his ten favorite films: 

 L'Avventura (Italy, 1960)
 Intolerance (USA, 1916)
 Jules et Jim (France, 1962)
 Lawrence of Arabia (UK, 1962)
 Lola (France, 1961)
 The Magnificent Ambersons (USA, 1942)
 Nashville (USA, 1975)
 Nouvelle Vague (France, 1990)
 The Passion of Joan of Arc (Denmark, 1927)
 Sansho the Bailiff (Japan, 1954)

White made some comments regarding some of his choices, saying: "Movies don’t change but we do. I did not see Sansho the Bailiff until recently and it had the same powerful effect on me as A.I. did ten years ago, so off with Spielberg to give Mizoguchi’s masterwork its props. Godard’s rarely screened Nouvelle Vague looms in my memory as his grandest work – grander and more important still due to cinephilia’s recent decline."

Personal life
White is gay and a Christian. According to the New York Times, White "lives by himself in Chelsea with no pets or plants, amid piles of DVDs. Standing 6-foot-3, he cuts an imposing figure. Yet in conversation, he comes across as exacting, quiet and polite, far different from what his writing—and seeming bad behavior—might suggest."

Public reception
White's work led film critic Roger Ebert to label him as "an intelligent critic and a passionate writer", but also a "smart and knowing [...] troll" in his 2009 essay Not in defense of Armond White. White has in turn criticized Ebert, stating "I do think it is fair to say that Roger Ebert destroyed film criticism. Because of the wide and far reach of television, he became an example of what a film critic does for too many people. And what he did simply was not criticism. It was simply blather."

In 2014, film critic Walter Biggins of RogerEbert.com penned an essay titled In defense of Armond White, a reference to Ebert's earlier essay. Biggins criticizes White's combative style, but defends him as a critic, describing White as "an important, distinctive, and...necessary voice in film criticism". Biggins states that "He's no troll, and he's one of the few critics capable of noting the inherent—and latent—racism of much of cinema and its discourse... he has provided a rare black voice, and perhaps an even rarer conservative voice, to film/video commentary."

Time Magazine wrote that White is an "undeniably talented writer" who "developed a kind of notoriety for his rather contrarian opinions. Some of his colleagues have praised his against-the-grain approach to film criticism, while many others, including a broad swath he's publicly condemned, have been less kind".

White has responded to negative criticism of his reviews stating, "If there were a whole bunch of critics who I thought were doing a good job, then I would stop...Because really, the reason why I do what I do is because I think there are things that need to be said about movies, about culture, about the world, that nobody's saying.

Critic Thelma Adams has cited White as an influence on her work.

Awards

Bibliography
 The Resistance: Ten Years of Pop Culture That Shook the World, 1995
 Rebel for the Hell of It: The Life of Tupac Shakur, 2002
 Keep Moving: The Michael Jackson Chronicles, 2009
 New Position: The Prince Chronicles, 2016
 Make Spielberg Great Again: The Steven Spielberg Chronicles, 2020

In popular culture
 White is briefly mentioned in Charlie Kaufman's 2020 absurdist novel Antkind. The novel's protagonist, a paranoid failed film critic, believes he is being spied on by White through the use of miniature drones disguised as bugs.

Further reading
 Roberts, Jerry. The Complete History of American Film Criticism. Santa Monica Press, 2010. 
 Lopate, Phillip (ed.). American Movie Critics: An Anthology From the Silents Until Now. Library of America, 2006.

See also
Elvis Mitchell – African-American film critic
African-American Film Critics Association
Vulgar auteurism

References

External links
Official website

Armond White at Rotten Tomatoes
Armond White at New York Press
Armond White at National Review

20th-century American male writers
20th-century American non-fiction writers
21st-century American male writers
21st-century American non-fiction writers
African-American Christians
African-American journalists
American Book Award winners
American Pentecostals
American film critics
American magazine editors
American music critics
Black conservatism in the United States
Columbia University School of the Arts alumni
Converts to Pentecostal denominations
Film theorists
Former Baptists
American gay writers
LGBT African Americans
LGBT conservatism in the United States
Living people
National Review people
New York Press people
Writers from Detroit
Variety (magazine) people
Writers from Michigan
Year of birth missing (living people)